Louth–Meath was a parliamentary constituency represented in Dáil Éireann, the lower house of the Irish parliament or Oireachtas from 1921 to 1923. The constituency elected 5 deputies (Teachtaí Dála, commonly known as TDs) to the Dáil, on the system of proportional representation by means of the single transferable vote (PR-STV).

History and boundaries 
The constituency was created in 1921, under the Government of Ireland Act 1920, for the 1921 general election to the House of Commons of Southern Ireland, whose members formed the 2nd Dáil. It was used again for the 1922 general election to the 3rd Dáil. It covered County Louth and County Meath.

Louth–Meath was abolished under the Electoral Act 1923, and replaced by the two new constituencies of Louth and Meath.

TDs

Elections

1922 general election

1921 general election 

|}

See also
Dáil constituencies
Politics of the Republic of Ireland
Historic Dáil constituencies
Elections in the Republic of Ireland

References

External links 
Oireachtas Members Database

Historic constituencies in County Louth
Historic constituencies in County Meath
Dáil constituencies in the Republic of Ireland (historic)
1921 establishments in Ireland
1923 disestablishments in Ireland
Constituencies established in 1921
Constituencies disestablished in 1923